White Rock Beverages (White Rock Products Corporation) is an American beverage company located in Whitestone, Queens, New York City.  The company was established in 1871 by pharmacist H.M. Colver in Waukesha, Wisconsin. The Potawatomi Indians and settlers believed that the nearby White Rock natural spring had special medicinal powers, so White Rock Beverages started out as a destination for vacationers and health seekers. By 1876, the company was bottling and distributing the natural spring water throughout the country.

Marketing with Santa Claus
Coca-Cola is frequently credited with the "invention" of the modern image of Santa Claus as an old man in red-and-white garments; however, White Rock predated Coca-Cola's usage of Santa in advertisements for soft drinks. In 1923, the company used Santa to advertise its ginger ale after first using him to sell mineral water in 1915.

Drink maker history

By 1923, White Rock Beverages was one of the largest producers of mineral water in the United States. The company also produced ginger ale and other soft drinks. Its property value was then calculated at $7,311,767 ($ today). This included land holdings and bottling plants.

In 1941, the company which manufactured White Rock soft drinks was called White Rock Mineral Springs Company.

Psyche logo
The company has used the image of Psyche as its logo for over 120 years. The company purchased the rights to a painting titled "Psyche at Nature's Mirror", by Paul Thumann, at the Chicago World's Fair in 1893.

Brand portfolio

White Rock
Seltzer Water: Plain, Lemon-Lime, Mandarin Orange, Black Cherry, Raspberry, Cucumber, Watermelon
Mixers: Ginger Ale, Diet Ginger Ale, Club Soda, Tonic Water, Diet Tonic Water
Organic: Passion Orange, Raspberry Crème, Red Peach
Soda: Cola, Root Beer, Cream Soda, Lemon-Lime, Orange, Grape, Black Cherry

Sioux City
Sarsaparilla – promoted on the label as "The Granddaddy of all Root Beers"
Diet Sarsaparilla
Root Beer
Birch Beer
Ginger Beer
Cream Soda
Black Cherry
Orange Cream
Prickly Pear
Berry Berry – a mixture of blueberry and raspberry flavors
Cherries 'n Mint

Olde Brooklyn:
Williamsburg Root Beer
Diet Williamsburg Root Beer
Bay Ridge Birch Beer
Coney Island Cream Soda
Diet Coney Island Cream Soda
Flatbush Orange Soda
Greenpoint Grape Soda
Red Hook Raspberry
Brighton Beach Black Cherry
Park Slope Ginger Ale

In popular culture

The beverage was widely used in speakeasies during Prohibition. In the 1927 mystery “The Egyptian Lure”, author Carroll John Daly has his hard-boiled detective Race Williams enter one during an investigation. Race is worried about both the possibility of getting bad liquor, and that someone might slip him a mickey finn. He speaks to a waiter:
““Bring me a split of White Rock,” I told him. “And be sure the cap’s tightly on. I carry my own opener.” The hurt expression of his fat face when he thought I’d questioned the honest intention of the house, lifted when I slipped him a five-case note—which was good pay for the water, but not too much if the cap was securely fastened. No—I didn’t suspect the joint, but I hate to put anyone in the way of temptation.” In 1929’s “The Tag Murders”, Race questions a girl in another speakeasy:
“The girl took coffee. I did myself a White Rock. Saw that the cap was tightly fastened, then knocked it off on the table lamp. I trusted that joint—but why put temptation in the way of high-moraled waiters?”

In the pre-Code film Men Call It Love, Norman Foster's character tells his butler "Say, look here, Brandt. Haven't you been with us long enough to know to always keep a supply of White Rock handy?" The butler stutters, "Why--why sir..." and then opens the fridge to reveal an ice box full of bottles of White Rock, with the Psyche logo clearly visible.

In another pre-Code film, 1931's Lonely Wives, Edward Everett Horton's characters ask Andrews, the butler, several times for a White Rock.

In Brad Strickland and John Bellairs' 1994 novel The Drum, the Doll, and the Zombie, Dr. Coote is described as crouching on his bed "like the White Rock girl on her stone."

In James M. Cain's novel The Postman Always Rings Twice, the narrator Frank Chambers mixes a drink with bourbon, White Rock and a couple of pieces of ice.

In Rex Stout's 1935 novel The League of Frightened Men, Archie Goodwin offers Hibbard a White Rock as a chaser with his whiskey.

In Wallace Thurman's novel The Blacker the Berry, a party of three, including the heroine Emma Lou, orders three bottles of White Rock in a Prohibition-era cabaret in Harlem.

An ad for White Rock Sparkling Water was the very first ad to appear in Gourmet magazine (January 1941).

References

External links
White Rock Beverages official web site

American soft drinks
Companies based in Queens, New York
Food production companies based in New York City
Drink companies of the United States
Food and drink companies established in 1871
Waukesha, Wisconsin
1871 establishments in Wisconsin
Food and drink companies based in New York City
American companies established in 1871